Ignacio "Nacho" Ramón del Valle (born 30 March 1999) is a Spanish footballer who plays for Elche CF Ilicitano as a forward.

Club career
Born in Elche, Valencian Community, Ramón represented Elche CF as a youth. He made his senior debut with the reserves on 7 October 2017, coming on as a second-half substitute in a 0–0 Tercera División away draw against CF Borriol.

Ahead of the 2018–19 campaign, Ramón switched between farm team UD Ilicitana in the regional leagues and the B-side in the fourth division. On 5 May 2019, he scored a hat-trick for the latter in a 6–2 home routing of Paiporta CF.

Ramón made his first-team debut on 4 June 2019, replacing Javi Flores in a 0–0 home draw against Deportivo de La Coruña in the Segunda División.

References

External links
 
 
 

1999 births
Living people
Footballers from Elche
Spanish footballers
Association football forwards
Segunda División players
Tercera División players
Divisiones Regionales de Fútbol players
Elche CF Ilicitano footballers
Elche CF players